Sheriff Stephen Wiley Brewer Farmstead, also known as the Regan Property, is a historic home and farm located at Pittsboro, Chatham County, North Carolina.  The main house was built about 1887, and is a two-story Italianate / Queen Anne style gable-and-wing frame dwelling. It features a gabled wing with one-story bay window and a one-story porch across the main block.  Also on the property are the contributing original granary and smokehouse.

It was listed on the National Register of Historic Places in 2003.

References

Houses on the National Register of Historic Places in North Carolina
Italianate architecture in North Carolina
Queen Anne architecture in North Carolina
Houses completed in 1887
Houses in Chatham County, North Carolina
National Register of Historic Places in Chatham County, North Carolina
Pittsboro, North Carolina